Interferon omega-1 is a protein that in humans is encoded by the IFNW1 gene.

References

Further reading

External links 
 PDBe-KB provides an overview of all the structure information available in the PDB for Human Interferon omega-1 (IFNW1)